Psychalgia may refer to:
psychogenic pain, physical pain of psychological origin
psychological pain, any non-physical pain